The Trans-European Transport Network (TEN-T) is a planned network of roads, railways, airports and water infrastructure in the European Union. The TEN-T network is part of a wider system of Trans-European Networks (TENs), including a telecommunications network (eTEN) and a proposed energy network (TEN-E or Ten-Energy). The European Commission adopted the first action plans on trans-European networks in 1990.

TEN-T envisages coordinated improvements to primary roads, railways, inland waterways, airports, seaports, inland ports and traffic management systems, providing integrated and intermodal long-distance, high-speed routes. A decision to adopt TEN-T was made by the European Parliament and Council in July 1996. The EU works to promote the networks by a combination of leadership, coordination, issuance of guidelines and funding aspects of development.

These projects are technically and financially managed by the Innovation and Networks Executive Agency (INEA), which superseded the Trans-European Transport Network Executive Agency (TEN-T EA) on 31 December 2013. The tenth and newest project, the Rhine-Danube Corridor, was announced for the 2014–2020 financial period.

History
TEN-T guidelines were initially adopted on 23 July 1996, with Decision No 1692/96/EC of the European Parliament and of the Council on Community guidelines for the development of the trans-European transport network. In May 2001, the European Parliament and the Council adopted a Decision No 1346/2001/EC, which amended the TEN-T Guidelines with respect to seaports, inland ports and intermodal terminals.

In April 2004, the European Parliament and the Council adopted Decision No 884/2004/EC (added to the list by Decision No 884/2004/EC), amending Decision No 1692/96/EC on Community guidelines for the development of the trans-European transport network. The April 2004 revision was a more fundamental change to TEN-T policies, intended to accommodate EU enlargement and consequent changes in traffic flows.

The evolution of the TEN-T was facilitated by a proposal in 1994 which included a series of priority projects.

In December 2013, with the Regulations (EU) 1315/2013 (TEN-T Guidelines), and (EU) 1316/2013 (Connecting Europe Facility 1), the TEN-T network has been defined on three levels, the Comprehensive network and the Core network, and therein the 9 Core network corridors.

On 17 October 2013, nine Core network corridors (instead of the 30 TENT Priority projects) were announced. These were: 
the Baltic–Adriatic Corridor (Poland–Czechia/Slovakia–Austria–Italy);
the North Sea–Baltic Corridor (Finland–Estonia–Latvia–Lithuania–Poland–Germany–Netherlands/Belgium);
the Mediterranean Corridor (Spain–France–Northern Italy–Slovenia–Croatia–Hungary);
the Orient/East–Med Corridor (Germany–Czech Republic–Austria/Slovakia–Hungary–Romania–Bulgaria–Greece–Cyprus);
the Scandinavian–Mediterranean Corridor (Finland–Sweden–Denmark–Germany–Austria–Italy);
the Rhine–Alpine Corridor (Netherlands/Belgium–Germany–Switzerland–Italy);
the Atlantic Corridor (formerly known as Lisboa–Strasbourg Corridor) (Portugal–Spain–France);
the North Sea–Mediterranean Corridor (Ireland–UK–Netherlands–Belgium–Luxembourg–Marseille(France), 
the Rhine–Danube Corridor (Germany–Austria–Slovakia–Hungary–Romania with branch Germany–Czechia–Slovakia);

In July 2021, with the Regulation (EU) 2021/1153 (Connecting Europe Facility 2), the 9 Core network corridors were extended, partially significantly (e.g. Atlantic, North-Sea Baltic, Scand-Med) while the North Sea-Med because of Brexit has changed to Ireland–Belgium-Netherlands and Ireland–France.

In December 2021, the European Commission's proposal for a new Regulation on TEN-T guidelines (COM 2021/821) proposes inter alia for the future a dissolution of selected Core network corridors (Orient/East–Med, North Sea–Mediterranean), its integration in other corridors (Rhine–Danube, North Sea–Alpine) and the creation of new aligned corridors (Baltic–Black–Aegean Seas, Western Balkans).

 Connections to neighbours
In 2017, it was decided that the Trans-European Transport Networks would be extended into Eastern Europe and would include Eastern Partnership member states. The furthest eastern expansion of the Trans-European Transport Network reached Armenia in February 2019.

As per the 2021 proposal, connections shall also lead to the UK, Switzerland, the South Mediterranean, Turkey, and the Western Balkans.

Core Network Corridors
This is the complete list of the TEN-T Core Network Corridors.

Funding timeline
Financial support for the implementation of TEN-T guidelines stems from the following rules:

 Regulation (EC) No 2236/95 of 18 September 1995 contains general rules for the granting of Community financial aid in the field of trans-European networks.
 Regulation (EC) No 1655/1999 of the European Parliament and of the Council of 19 July 1999 amends Regulation (EC) No 2236/95.
 Regulation (EC) No 807/2004 of the European Parliament and of the Council of 21 April 2004 amends Council Regulation (EC) No 2236/95.
 Regulation (EC) No 680/2007 of the European Parliament and of the Council of 20 June 2007 supplies general rules for granting Community financial aid for trans-European transport and energy networks.

In general, TEN-T projects are mostly funded by national or state governments. Other funding sources include: European Community funds (ERDF, Cohesion Funds, TEN-T budget), loans from international financial institutions (e.g. the European Investment Bank), and private funding.

List of transport networks 
Each transportation mode has a network. The networks are:
Trans-European road network
Trans-European Rail network, which includes the Trans-European high-speed rail network as well as the Trans-European conventional rail network
Trans-European Inland Waterway network and inland ports
Trans-European Seaport network
Motorways of the Sea (added by Decision No 884/2004/EC)
Trans-European Airport network
Trans-European Combined Transport network
Trans-European Shipping Management and Information network
Trans-European Air Traffic Management network, which includes the Single European Sky and SESAR concepts
Trans-European Positioning and Navigation network, which includes the Galileo

Previous priorities
At its meeting in Essen in 1994, the European Council endorsed a list of 14 TEN-T ‘specific’ projects, drawn up by a group chaired by then Commission Vice-President Henning Christophersen. Following the 2003 recommendations from the Van Miert TEN-T high-level group, the Commission compiled a list of 30 priority projects to be launched before 2010.

The 30 axes and priority projects were:

As of 2019, several of them are finished, e.g. no 2, 5 and 11, other are ongoing e.g. no 12 and 17, and some are not started, e.g no 27.

Related networks
In addition to the various TENs, there are ten Pan-European corridors, which are paths between major urban centres and ports, mainly in Eastern Europe, that have been identified as requiring major investment.

The international E-road network is a naming system for major roads in Europe managed by the United Nations Economic Commission for Europe.  It numbers roads with a designation beginning with "E" (such as "E1").

See also 
 Berlin–Palermo railway axis
 Messina Bridge
 Transport in Europe
 TRACECA

References

External links
 Trans-European Transport Network (TEN-T) at European Union official web site
 TEN-T Map (as of 2021)
 Plans as of October 2013

Trans-European Transport Network